Mangel is a surname. Notable people with the surname include:

Ernst Michael Mangel (1800–1887), Hungarian musician and composer
Marcel Mangel, aka Marcel Marceau (1923–2007), French mime
Laurent Mangel (born 1981), French racing cyclist

Fictional characters:
 The Mangel family in the Australian TV soap opera Neighbours:
Kerry Bishop Mangel, wife of Joe Mangel, mother of Sky Mangel
Kerry Breanna Mangel, Kerry Mangel, Jr., daughter of Sky Mangel
Joe Mangel, son of Len and Nell Mangel
Nell Mangel, Eleanor "Nell" Worthington, Nell Worthington, mother of Joe Mangel
Sky Mangel, stepdaughter of Joe Mangel
Toby Mangel, son of Joe Mangel

See also

Johanna Mängel (born 1990), Estonian cellist
Mangels (surname)
Mangle (machine)